The 1976 Pacific Coast Athletic Association men's basketball tournament (now known as the Big West Conference men's basketball tournament) was held March 6–7 at the Stockton Memorial Civic Auditorium in Stockton, California. This was the first edition of the tournament.

 defeated  in the championship game, 76–64, to win their first PCAA/Big West men's basketball tournament. 

The Aztecs, in turn, received a bid to the 1976 NCAA tournament.

Format
Despite the PCAA containing six members for the 1975–76 season, only the top four teams from the standings took part in the tournament field.

Bracket

References

Tournament
Big West Conference men's basketball tournament
College basketball tournaments in California
Sports competitions in Stockton, California
Pacific Coast Athletic Association men's basketball tournament
Pacific Coast Athletic Association men's basketball tournament